Margaret or Maggie Jones may refer to:

Maggie Jones, Baroness Jones of Whitchurch  (born 1955), British Labour politician
Maggie Jones (actress) (1934–2009), British actress (Coronation Street)
Maggie Jones (blues musician) (1894–?), American blues singer and pianist
Margaret B. Jones, pseudonym of Margaret Seltzer, American writer of a discredited autobiography
Margaret Jones (journalist) (1923–2006), Australian journalist
Margaret Jones (Puritan midwife) (1613–1648), first person to be executed for witchcraft in Massachusetts Bay Colony
Margaret Jones (writer) (1842–1902), Welsh travel writer
Maggie Elizabeth Jones (born 2003), American child actress
Margaret Ursula Jones (1916–2001), British archaeologist

See also
Peggy Jones (disambiguation)